USS Nautilus may refer to:

 , a 12-gun schooner (1799–1812)
 , a 76-foot coast survey schooner (1838–1859)
 , a Narwhal-class submarine (1930–1945)
 , the first nuclear submarine (1954–1980)

See also
 Ships named Nautilus
 , a H-class submarine (1913–1930) called Nautilus only during construction
 , a 66-foot patrol/escort (1917–1919)
 , an O-11-class submarine (1917–1931) which carried the name Nautilus during a civilian arctic expedition in 1931
 Nautilus, a cephalopod which is the namesake of these vessels 

United States Navy ship names